Noble Township, Ohio may refer to several places:

Noble Township, Auglaize County, Ohio
Noble Township, Defiance County, Ohio
Noble Township, Noble County, Ohio

Ohio township disambiguation pages